This is a list of films produced by the Tollywood film industry based in Hyderabad in 1954. Movies released 29

References 

1954
Telugu
Telugu films